Esquire Tower, also known as Esquire Plaza, is a 322-foot (98 m) 248,816 square foot office building in downtown Sacramento, California.  
The Esquire IMAX Theater  as well as a restaurant are located on the ground level of Esquire Plaza.

Gallery

See also
List of tallest buildings in Sacramento

References

External links 

Skyscraper office buildings in Sacramento, California
HOK (firm) buildings
Office buildings completed in 1999
1999 establishments in California